Graeme Wilson may refer to:

 Graeme Wilson (translator) (1919–1992), British academic and translator
 Graeme Wilson (footballer) (born 1953), former Australian rules footballer

See also 
 Graham Wilson (disambiguation)